United States naval architects or ship designers introduced the faster and larger sailing frigates and sloop-of-wars of the early United States Navy which influenced the later merchant ships and clipper ships.

Naval architects 

Name - Years served
 Ships designed

Joshua Humphreys 1794 to 1801
 
 
 
 
 Hassan Bashaw, 1797 brig (DANFS)

Josiah Fox 1794 to 1801, 1804 to 1809

William Doughty 1813 to 1837

Benjamin Hutton  1803
 brig , schooners  (DANFS) and Skjoldebrand (DANFS), and 

Samuel Humphreys 1813 to 1846

Francis Grice 1817 to 1859

Henry Eckford 1817 to 1820
 all the War of 1812 Lake Ontario men-of-war,  (DANFS),  (DANFS),  (DANFS + DANFS),  (DANFS), schooner , Mahmoudieh (for the Ottoman Empire), and the  class 74s in 1820.

Samuel M. Pook 1841 to 1866
  (DANFS),  and

See also
Naval architecture

References
 Chapelle, Howard I. (1935). The History of American Sailing Ships. ,  
 DANFS Dictionary of American Naval Fighting Ships

 
Naval architect